The Cooper Mk.IX is an open-wheel Formula Three race car, designed, developed and built by British manufacturer Cooper in 1955. The first version, dubbed the T36, was powered by a  JA Prestwich Industries (JAP) single-cylinder engine, and featured a singular brake disk at the rear of the car, flatter springs to mitigate ground clearance, altered and adjusted center spring mountings, and reworked engine mounts. The second version, dubbed the T37, featured an elongated chassis and body, and a larger and more powerful  OHV V-2 engine. Chassis construction was a tubular space frame, and the body was made from aluminium (although glass fibre was later experimented with).

References

Cooper racing cars
Formula Three cars